254 Squadron may refer to:

254 Squadron (Israel)
No. 254 Squadron RAF, United Kingdom

See also
254 (Specialist Group Information Services) Signal Squadron, United Kingdom